Motherwell TMD is a traction maintenance depot in Motherwell, Scotland. The depot code is ML.

History
In 1987 the depot had an allocation of Classes 08, 20 and 37 locomotives, and the depot had an Anvil and Hammer logo. Classes 26, 27 and 47 were also usually stabled at the depot.

Following the privatisation of British Rail, the depot was operated by EWS. It closed in 2007, with its operations relocated to nearby Mossend. Following the closure of the depot, the office space was taken over by site owners Network Rail as a new maintenance depot for the Motherwell area.

It was later reopened by Direct Rail Services who currently use it to stable Class 68 locomotives and Mark 2 carriages operated on Fife Circle services for ScotRail.

References

Sources

External links

An overhead view of the depot.

Railway depots in Scotland
Transport in North Lanarkshire
Buildings and structures in Motherwell